Erna E. Wetzel, also known by the stage name of Patricia Saubert-Wetzel; (October 11, 1899 – March 17, 1992) was an American painter. Her work was part of the painting event in the art competition at the 1936 Summer Olympics.

References

1899 births
1992 deaths
20th-century American painters
American women painters
Olympic competitors in art competitions
20th-century American women artists